Demos Two Thousand is a 2005 compilation of songs from two of Leviathan's earlier demos - Shadows of No Light and Misanthropicnecroblasphemy, both of which were recorded in 2000. The album was released a limited batch of 500 cassettes. All tracks are by Jef Whitehead.

Track listing
Side I

Side II

Personnel 
Jef Whitehead – all instruments, vocals

References

Leviathan (musical project) albums
2005 compilation albums
Demo albums
Black metal compilation albums